Ring dove is an alternative name for the Barbary dove. It may also refer to:

Species
The common wood pigeon (Columba palumbus), particularly in older literature
The ring-necked dove (Streptopelia capicola), also known as the Cape turtle dove or half-collared dove
The Eurasian collared dove (Streptopelia decaocto)
The vinaceous dove (Streptopelia vinacea)
The red-eyed dove (Streptopelia semitorquata)
The red collared dove (Streptopelia tranquebarica), also known as the red turtle dove
The mourning collared dove or African mourning dove (Streptopelia decipiens)
The African collared dove (Streptopelia roseogrisea)

Other uses
HMS Ringdove, a name used for seven ships of the Royal Navy
, a coaster in service 1947-50
Ringdove, a former capital city located on Epi (island), Vanuatu